The following is the discography of American singer Tennessee Ernie Ford.

Albums

Singles

References 

Ford, Ernie
Country music discographies